Silas Condit (August 18, 1778 – November 29, 1861) was a U.S. Representative from New Jersey, serving one term from 1831 to 1833.

Early life and career
Condit was born in Orange, New Jersey. He was the son of John Condit. Condit graduated from Princeton College in 1795.
He engaged in mercantile pursuits in Orange, and moved to Newark, New Jersey.

Political career
He served as clerk of Essex County from 1804 to 1811, and as Sheriff of Essex County from 1813 to 1816.
He served as member of the New Jersey General Assembly in 1812, 1813, and 1816, and served in the New Jersey Legislative Council from 1819 to 1822.

He served as president of the Newark Banking Co. 1820–1842.

Congress
Condit was elected as an Anti-Jacksonian to the Twenty-second Congress, serving in office from March 4, 1831 to March 3, 1833.
He engaged in banking.
He served as delegate to the State constitutional convention in 1844.

Death
He died in Newark, New Jersey, November 29, 1861, and was interred in that city's First Presbyterian Church Cemetery.

References
Notes

Sources

Silas Condit at The Political Graveyard

1778 births
1861 deaths
New Jersey sheriffs
Members of the New Jersey General Assembly
Members of the New Jersey Legislative Council
Politicians from Newark, New Jersey
Princeton University alumni
People from Orange, New Jersey
National Republican Party members of the United States House of Representatives from New Jersey